"That's Not Me" is a song by British MC Skepta, featuring his brother Jme. It was released on 8 June 2014 as a digital download in the United Kingdom on iTunes as the lead single from Skepta's fourth album Konnichiwa (2016). The song peaked at number 21 on the UK Singles Chart.

"That's Not Me" is an intentional throwback to the early era of grime music. Complex magazine ranked the song number 1 on its list of "Grime's Most Impactful Songs of the 2010s", calling it "one for the history books".

Music video
A music video directed made by Tim & Barry to accompany the release of "That's Not Me" was first released on YouTube on 13 April 2014, at a total length of 3:04. It was preceded by a short documentary shot on VHS in a style intended to invoke early grime DVDs such as Lord of the Mics and Practice Hours. This video, which had a budget of £80, won the Award for Best Video at the 2014 MOBO Awards.

Track listings

Chart performance

Weekly charts

Certifications

Release history

References

2014 singles
2014 songs
Jme (musician) songs
Skepta songs
Songs written by Skepta